The ICEX Main List is an equity index fund which tracks the Main List of the Iceland Stock Exchange Ltd. (ICEX).

External links
Íslandsbanki: ICEX Main List

European stock market indices
Economy of Iceland